Meindert Wiardi Beckman (16 January 1795, Amsterdam - 8 April 1863, The Hague) was a Dutch politician and judge.

Wiardi Beckman was a member of the municipal council of Amsterdam and Minister of Religious Affairs in the Van der Brugghen cabinet.

He is the great-grandfather of SDAP Senator Herman Bernard Wiardi Beckman.

References 
  Parlement.com biography

1795 births
1863 deaths
19th-century Dutch judges
Ministers of Religious Affairs of the Netherlands
Members of the Council of State (Netherlands)
Municipal councillors of Amsterdam
University of Amsterdam alumni
Utrecht University alumni